Huddersfield Town's 1958–59 campaign was a season under Bill Shankly, which saw Town make little progress up the Division 2 table, with the team finishing in 14th place.

Squad at the start of the season

Review
Bill Shankly attempted to improve on Town's 9th-place finish the previous season. Their form was mixed for a large portion of the season with many wins, draws and losses at exactly the wrong time of the season. Their best wins were a 5–0 win over Liverpool, a 5–1 win over Middlesbrough and a 5–2 away win at Leyton Orient.

They finished in 14th place with just 40 points, although they were 12 points clear of relegated Grimsby Town, but they were 20 points behind promoted Fulham.

Squad at the end of the season

Results

Division Two

FA Cup

Appearances and goals

References

1958-59
English football clubs 1958–59 season